Saša Jovanović (Serbian Cyrillic: Саша Јовановић; born 30 August 1993) is a Serbian football left winger who plays for Radnički Kragujevac.

References

External links
 
 
 Stats at Utakmica.rs

1993 births
Living people
Footballers from Belgrade
Association football midfielders
Serbian footballers
Serbian expatriate footballers
FK BASK players
FK Palić players
FK Rad players
FK Teleoptik players
FK Voždovac players
FK Bežanija players
FK Čukarički players
Wolfsberger AC players
FK Inđija players
FK Radnički 1923 players
Serbian First League players
Serbian SuperLiga players
Austrian Football Bundesliga players
Serbian expatriate sportspeople in Austria
Expatriate footballers in Austria